The 2023 Challenger Biel/Bienne was a professional tennis tournament played on indoor hard courts. It was the third edition of the tournament which was part of the 2023 ATP Challenger Tour. It took place in Biel/Bienne, Switzerland between 20 and 26 March 2023.

Singles main-draw entrants

Seeds

 1 Rankings are as of 13 March 2023.

Other entrants
The following players received wildcards into the singles main draw:
  Mika Brunold
  Dylan Dietrich
  Jakub Paul

The following player received entry into the singles main draw using a protected ranking:
  Thai-Son Kwiatkowski

The following players received entry from the qualifying draw:
  Marius Copil
  Daniel Cukierman
  Enrico Dalla Valle
  Francesco Forti
  Kirill Kivattsev
  Neil Oberleitner

Champions

Singles

  vs.

Doubles

  /  vs.  /

References

2023 ATP Challenger Tour
March 2023 sports events in Switzerland
2023 in Swiss sport